Reina (the Spanish word for queen) or La Reina may refer to:

Geography
 Reina, Badajoz, a municipality in the province of Badajoz, Extremadura, Spain
 Reina, Estonia, a village in Saaremaa Parish, Saare County, Estonia
 La Reina, a commune of Chile
 La Reina, Chalatenango, a municipality in El Salvador

People
 Reina (given name), a list of notable people with the given name
 Reina (surname), a list of notable people with the surname
 Reina (musician), American singer and songwriter Lori Reina Goldstein (born 1975)
 Alexia Putellas, Spanish footballer, nicknamed La Reina

Arts and entertainment
 Reina (album), by the band Kinky
 Reina, a character in the Rave Master series
 Reina, a character from the Hokuto no Ken franchise
 Reina Kousaka, a character in Hibike! Euphonium
 "La Reina", a song from Christina Aguilera's ninth studio album Aguilera (2022)

Other uses
 Hyundai Reina, a subcompact sedan manufactured in China by Hyundai
 Reina (nightclub), location of the January 1, 2017, Istanbul nightclub attack
 La Reina High School, a Catholic high school for girls in Los Angeles
 Reina, another name for the wine grape Mourvèdre
 La Reina (cattle), a Nicaraguan breed of cattle
 Reina World Tag Team Championship, a Japanese wrestling championship

See also
Rena (disambiguation)
Reyna (disambiguation)